Multi-cordoned Ware culture or Multiroller ceramics culture, translations of the , also known as the Multiple-relief-band ware culture, the Babyno culture  and the Mnogovalikovaya kul'tura (MVK), are archaeological names for a Middle Bronze Age culture of Eastern Europe.

Distribution
From approximately the 22nd to 18th centuries BCE, it occupied an area stretching from the Don to Moldavia, including Dnieper Ukraine, Right-bank Ukraine, and part of the modern Ternopil Oblast, and was bordered by the Volga to the east.

Origins
KMK succeeded the western Catacomb culture.

Characteristics

In 1929, the archaeologist Ya. Brik studied four kurgans of this culture near Ostapye village, currently in Ternopil Raion, Ukraine. He found ceramics, flint tools, bone and bronze decorations. Bottoms, walls and ceilings of the graves are layered with rocks. Skeletons are laid in contracted position towards the east.

The name of this culture is related to its ceramic goods, such as pots, which were decorated with multiple strips of clay (cordons) before firing. The culture also featured various other distinctive ornaments

KMK tribes practiced herding and made widespread use of chariots. According to Anthony (2007), chariotry spread from the Multi-cordoned ware culture to the Monteoru, Vatin and Ottomány cultures in southeastern Europe.

200 or more Multi-cordoned Ware settlements have been documented, some with cultural deposits 1 metre thick (e.g. Babino III). Occasional fortified settlements are known, pointing to higher interregional conflict than in previous periods. Houses included sunken earth-houses and ground-level wooden-post buildings with a rectangular plan.

Physical type
The physical type of the Multi-cordoned Ware culture has been designated as dolichocephalic.

Ethnicity
Circumstantial evidence links KMK to the spread of one or more Indo-European languages. Leo Klejn identifies its bearers with the early Thracians. Other scholars suggest that KMK may have been connected to the Bryges and/or Phrygians.

Successors
It was increasingly influenced, assimilated and eventually displaced by the Timber grave or Srubna/Srubnaya culture. In  – 1800 BCE bearers of KMK migrated southward into the Balkans.

Notes

References

Sources

Literature
 Куштан Д.П. Памятники Культуры Многоваликовой Керамики В Среднем Поднепровье (По Материалам Разведок В Зоне Кременчугского Водохранилища)
 Тернопільський енциклопедичний словник. — Тернопіль, видавничо-поліграфічний комбінат «Збруч», том 1, 2004.
 Тернопілля: сторінки історії. — X, 1995;
 Словник-довідник з археології. — К., 1996.

Archaeological cultures of Eastern Europe
Archaeological cultures in Moldova
Archaeological cultures in Russia
Archaeological cultures in Ukraine
Bronze Age cultures of Europe
Indo-European archaeological cultures